The Glagolev-Shipunov-Gryazev GShG-7.62 also known as TKB-621, is a four-barreled rotary machine gun designed in the Soviet Union, similar to firearms such as the M134 Minigun. It is a hybrid weapon using both propellant gas and an electric drive to rotate the barrels, which is in contrast with most other rotary guns (that are often exclusively powered via an electric drive). It was developed in 1968–1970 for the Mi-24 helicopter together with YakB 12.7mm machine gun, and is currently used in GUV-8700 gun pods, and flexible mounts on Kamov Ka-29.

See also 
Fokker-Leimberger
Hua Qing Minigun
XM214 Microgun
M197 Gatling gun
Komodo Armament Eli gun
Nordenfelt Gun
Gast Gun
Chain gun
Gatling gun, the 1860s firearm that originated the rotating-barrel concept
List of Russian weaponry

References

External links
Archived page of GShG at the manufacturer's website - no longer listed in production

Rotary cannon
7.62×54mmR machine guns
Aircraft guns of the Soviet Union
Multi-barrel machine guns
Machine guns of the Soviet Union
Cold War firearms of the Soviet Union
Machine guns of Russia
KBP Instrument Design Bureau products
Military equipment introduced in the 1970s